The 1984 Midwest pipe bombing was a plot involving a series of pipe-bombs planted in Minnesota, Illinois and Wisconsin, by Earl Steven Karr.

Incident
In May and June 1984, an American, Earl Steven Karr, planted over 20 pipe-bombs about Minnesota, Illinois and Wisconsin. He was arrested in Mason City, Iowa after a pipe-bomb he was transporting detonated in the trunk of his car. Only one person is known to have been injured by his explosives. Notes left near the bombs took credit in the name of the "North Central Gay Strike Force Against Public and Police Oppression."

References 

1984 crimes in the United States
1984 in Illinois
1984 in Iowa
1984 in Minnesota
1984 in Wisconsin
Explosions in 1984
Far-left terrorism
Improvised explosive device bombings in the United States
June 1984 events in the United States
May 1984 events in the United States